Ogasawara (written: 小笠原) is a Japanese surname. It may also refer to:

Locations
 Ogasawara Islands, also known as the Bonin Islands, an archipelago of over 30 islands about 1000 km south of Tokyo, Japan
 Ogasawara National Park, an island national park located on that archipelago
 Ogasawara Subprefecture, a subprefecture of Tokyo, Japan
 Ogasawara, Tokyo, a village in Ogasawara Subprefecture, Tokyo, Japan, that governs the Bonin Islands

People with the surname
, a Japanese voice actress
, a Japanese anime director from Chiba, Japan
, a Japanese Olympic Curler
, a Japanese baseball player
, Japanese speed skater
, a Japanese football (soccer) player
, Japanese baseball player
, Japanese rower

Fictional
, a fictional main character in the Maria-sama ga Miteru media series
, a character from Hibike! Euphonium

Historical
, a Japanese samurai clan
, a Japanese retainer of the Minamoto clan during the Heian period
, the 6th and final daimyō of Karatsu Domain in Hizen Province, Kyūshū, Japan
, a Japanese samurai and official in the Bakumatsu period Tokugawa Shogunate
, an Admiral and naval strategist in the Imperial Japanese Navy in Meiji and Taishō period Japan
, a Japanese daimyo of the mid-Edo period
, a Japanese daimyo of Shinano Province during the Sengoku Period
, the eldest son of Ogasawara Nagakiyo
, a Japanese daimyo of the late Edo period who ruled the Kokura Domain
, Japanese daimyo of the early Edo Period

Other
 10169 Ogasawara, a Main-belt Asteroid discovered on February 21, 1995
 Ogasawara High School, a public high school on Chichi-jima in Ogasawara, Tokyo, Japan

See also
 Izu–Ogasawara Trench
 Ogasawara Whale Watching Association

Japanese-language surnames